John Philip Monckton-Arundell, 13th Viscount Galway (born April 8, 1952 in Saint Boniface, Manitoba) is a Canadian rower. He won a bronze medal in the Quadruple Sculls event at the 1984 Summer Olympics. He also competed in the coxless four event at the 1976 Summer Olympics, finishing in 5th place. He succeeded his father as Viscount Galway on September 30, 2017.

External links
 

1952 births
Living people
Canadian male rowers
Olympic rowers of Canada
Olympic bronze medalists for Canada
Rowers at the 1976 Summer Olympics
Rowers at the 1984 Summer Olympics
Rowers from Winnipeg
People from Saint Boniface, Winnipeg
Olympic medalists in rowing
Medalists at the 1984 Summer Olympics
Pan American Games medalists in rowing
Pan American Games gold medalists for Canada
Pan American Games silver medalists for Canada
Galway, John Philip Monckton-Arundell, 13th Viscount
Rowers at the 1975 Pan American Games
Rowers at the 1979 Pan American Games